The Cocollona is a folkloric creature from Girona.

Appearance 

The cocollona is a river monster of Gironian mythology. According to legend, she was once a nun who, due to her lack of faith, was punished and imprisoned in the dungeon of the city's monastery, and could only leave to go to the river that runs through the city—the Onyar. After many years, due to her undernourishment and isolation, she grew scales until she fully metamorphosed into a crocodile-like creature. In spite of this punishment, she was still somewhat saintly, which manifested as a pair of butterfly wings.

Some time after her death, her ghost began to haunt the Onyar river, usually near the old bridges where she was sometimes spotted by fishermen. Nowadays her translucent form can only be spotted under the light of the full moon, and only by those who are particularly attuned to such things.

Origin

The origin of this legend is uncertain to the point that it may not have its historical origin. It is believed that figure was created by the Cocollona own tour guides in an effort to add a new creature beasts of mythology Girona.

External links 
 Pedres de Girona

Catalan mythology
Catalan legendary creatures